The Operational Group of Russian Forces in Transnistria (OGRF; , ;) is a sizable overseas military task force of the Russian Armed Forces. It served as part of the tri-lateral Joint Control Commission in the region. 1,500 soldiers of the military force are based at the former decommissioned Soviet-era ammunition depot at Cobasna, where it guards around 22,000 tons of military equipment and ammunition. The core of the OGRT consists of 70 to 100 Russian officers, rotate once every six months. The rest being Transnistrian locals employed as Russian soldiers. Moldova no longer allowed this rotation of Russian troops since 2015.

History

14th Army background and Transnistria War

The Soviet Army's 14th Guards Army was formed in November 1956 in Kishinev as one of the only formation of the Odessa Military District to be stationed in the Moldovan SSR. The army headquarters was moved to Tiraspol, the capital of Pridnestrovian Moldavian Soviet Socialist Republic in the early 1980s. At the start of the Transnistrian War, soldiers of the 14th Guards Army who were sympathetic to the PMR cause "defected"  with total military structure and commanding system, and remained under Moscow command, and, with some assistance of the Transnistrian Republican Guard, created the strongest local military force, despite the Russian government's official declaration of neutrality. On 23 June, Major General Alexander Lebed of the 14th Guards Army, who had orders to evacuate the local logistics center, began an over two week battle which ended in an artillery strike on 3 July on a Moldovan unit in a forest near Bender (Tighina). It is generally accepted that this strike led to the strategic victory of the Transnistrian/Russian military and the tactical setbacks of the military of Moldova, creating a Moscow-controlled occupational zone, and a Moldovan government had lost control over a part of Moldova.

OGRF establishment
After the war, the 14th Army was split between the Ukrainian Armed Forces and the Russian Army, with most of the Russian contingent being absorbed into Western Military District. The conclusion of the conflict in a cease-fire resulted in the beginning of trilateral negotiations between the governments and militaries of Russia, Transnistria and Moldova, which eventually led to the discussion of a joint peacekeeping force. In June 1995, the Operational Group of Russian Forces in Transnistria was founded by order of the General Staff of the Russian Armed Forces. In 2005, the force consisted of the 8th Guards Motor Rifle Brigade, the 1162nd Anti-Aircraft Rocket Regiment, 15th Signals Regiment, as well as other support units.

The OGRF today
The OGRF ostensibly remains in Transnistria to  guard the ammunition depot at Cobasna. It also provides additional support to the Armed Forces of Transnistria. Today, around 350-400 troops with the operational force report directly to the JCC and can be assigned to it at any given time. The task force provides the largest contingent of soldiers in the region. On 27 June 2016, the Transnistrian government passed new law which penalized any actions or public statements that criticize the OGRF. The punishment for committing this crime is 3-7 years in jail. In recent years, the OGRF has taken part in Victory Day Parades in on Suvorov Square, often to the dismay of Chisinau.

Calls for withdraw and UN resolution 
Since its introduction, the OGRF has been met with criticism from both Moldovan and Western officials and observers, all of whom claim that the Russian military presence is either illegal or unnecessary. In November 2008, the NATO Parliamentary Assembly adopted a resolution, urging Russia to withdraw the force in accordance with its commitments at the 1999 Istanbul OSCE Summit.

In June 2018, United Nations General Assembly adopted resolution (document A/72/L.58), which essentially called on the Russian Federation to withdraw the OGRF from Moldovan territory immediately. While the Moldovan government led by Pavel Filip supported it, President Igor Dodon condemned the resolution, saying that the Russian presence led to the "creation of conditions for a political process of negotiations". Previously, Dodon supported the Moldovan parliament on this issue.

In 2020, Moldovan president-elect Maia Sandu declared that OGRF should withdraw from the breakaway Transnistria, saying to the RBK that although they guard ammunition depots, "there are no bilateral agreements on the OGRF and on the weapons depots.” She also stated that its her position that the "mission should be transformed into an OSCE civilian observer mission.”

In 2022, as the Russian invasion of Ukraine was taking place, the Chief Directorate of Intelligence of the Ministry of Defence of Ukraine reported that residents in Transnistria were refusing to sign contracts with the Operational Group of Russian Forces despite being promised "high cash payments, social packages, and likely housing". The report also said that there were being several cases of desertion in the military unit and that there were not enough necessary resources to search for and recover soldiers.

Structure (as of 2015)

 Group headquarters
 82nd Separate Guards Motorized Rifle Battalion 
 Battalion HQ
 4 Motorized Rifle Companies
 Headquarters platoon 
 Grenadier Platoon
 Technical Support Platoon 
 Material Support Platoon 
 Medical Platoon
 113th Separate Guards Motorized Rifle Battalion 
 Battalion HQ
 4 Motorized Rifle Companies
 Headquarters platoon
 Grenadier Platoon
 Technical Support Platoon 
 Material Support Platoon 
 Medical Platoon
 540th Separate Command Battalion  
 Battalion HQ 
 Guard Company
 Company headquarters
 4 guard platoons
 Counterintelligence Department of the FSB
 Communication Center
 Field Mail Station
 Engineering Platoon
 Storage Department 
 Maintenance Company (equipped with MTO-AT-M1)
 Material Support Company
 Fuel depot
 Military band
 Firing range

Commanders of the OGRF

The following generals commanded the unit:

 Lieutenant General Valery Yevnevich (November 1995–16 January 2002)
 Major General Boris Sergeev (16 January 2002–11 September 2009)
 Colonel Vyacheslav Sitchikhin (11 September 2009–2010)
 Colonel Sergey Nyrkov (2010–2011)
 Colonel Valery Plohotnyuk (1 December 2011–15 March 2013)
 Colonel Sergey Goryachev (15 March 2013–25 December 2014)
 Colonel Dmitry Zelenkov (25 December 2014–Present)

See also
 List of Russian military bases abroad
 Russian military presence in Transnistria
 59th Guards Motor Rifle Division

References

External links

Army units and formations of Russia
Military installations of Russia in other countries
Military units and formations established in 1995
Military of Transnistria